Rhytiphora armatula is a species of beetle in the family Cerambycidae. It was described by White in 1859.

References

armatula
Beetles described in 1859